Patti Bown (July 26, 1931, Seattle, Washington – March 21, 2008, Media, Pennsylvania) was an American jazz pianist, composer, and singer.

Early life and career
Bown was born in Seattle, the daughter of Augustus Bown and Edith Ruth Cahill Brown. She began playing piano at age two. Her sister Edith Bown Valentine was a classical pianist; another sister, Millie Bown Russell, became known for her work on diversity in STEM education. 

Bown studied piano while attending the University in Seattle on a music scholarship. She played in local orchestras toward the end of the 1940s. From 1956, she worked as a soloist in New York City, playing early on in sessions with Billy Eckstine and Jimmy Rushing. She released an album under her own name, Patti Bown Plays Big Piano, in 1958 for the Columbia label. The next year she was invited by Quincy Jones to join an orchestra for the European tour of the musical Free and Easy.  While there she also played with Bill Coleman in Paris. In the 1960s, she recorded with Gene Ammons, Oliver Nelson, Cal Massey, Duke Ellington, Roland Kirk, George Russell, and Harry Sweets Edison. Her musical compositions were recorded by Sarah Vaughan, Benny Golson, and Duke Ellington. She also recorded with soul musicians such as Aretha Franklin and James Brown.  Between 1962 and 1964, she served as the musical director for the bands accompanying Dinah Washington and Sarah Vaughan.

In the 1970s, Bown worked as a pianist in orchestras on Broadway and composed for film and television. She played regularly at the Village Gate nightclub for many years and lived in Greenwich Village for the last 37 years of her life.

Discography
With Gene Ammons
Up Tight! (Prestige, 1961)
Boss Soul! (Prestige, 1961)
Soul Summit Vol. 2 (Prestige, 1962)
Late Hour Special (Prestige, 1962 [1964])
The Soulful Moods of Gene Ammons (Moodsville, 1962)
Sock! (Prestige, 1962 [1965])
With Billy Byers
Impressions of Duke Ellington (Mercury, 1961)
With Art Farmer
New York Jazz Sextet: Group Therapy (Scepter, 1966)
With Etta Jones
Lonely and Blue (Prestige, 1962)
With Quincy Jones
The Birth of a Band! (Mercury, 1959)
The Great Wide World of Quincy Jones (Mercury, 1959)
I Dig Dancers (Mercury, 1960)
Quincy Plays for Pussycats (Mercury, 1959-65 [1965])
With Cal Massey
Blues to Coltrane (Candid)
With Oliver Nelson
Afro/American Sketches (Prestige, 1962)
Fantabulous (Argo, 1964)
The Spirit of '67 with Pee Wee Russell (Impulse!, 1967)
Jazzhattan Suite (Verve, 1967)
With Cal Tjader
Warm Wave (Verve, 1964)
Hip Vibrations (Verve, 1967)
With Big Joe Turner
Singing the Blues (BluesWay, 1967)
With Dave Van Ronk
Songs for Ageing Children (Cadet, 1973)
With Roswell Rudd
 Blown Bone (Philips, 1979)
With Eddie "Cleanhead" Vinson
Cherry Red (BluesWay, 1967)
With Dinah Washington
I Wanna Be Loved (Mercury, 1961)
Dinah Washington Sings Fats Waller (EmArcy, 1957)

References
Eugene Chadbourne, [ Patti Bown] at Allmusic
Wilson, John S. "Patti Bown on Piano". The New York Times, July 1, 1985.

Further reading

Articles
 Dance, Helen (October 19, 1967). "Down Patty: A Profile of Patti Bown". Down Beat. p. 23–24
 "The Girl on the Bandstand". St Louis Post-Dispatch. January 27, 1988. pp. 86, 87.

Books
 Unterbrink, Mary (1983). Jazz Women at the Keyboard. Jefferson, NC : McFarland & Company. pp. [https://www.mediafire.com/view/wc34yb0m1sgrbrz/ 137–142, 140–142.

External links
Patti Bown papers, 1940-2007, held by Manuscripts, Archives and Rare Books Division, Schomburg Center for Research in Black Culture, New York Public Library.

1931 births
2008 deaths
Musicians from Seattle
American women jazz singers
American jazz singers
American jazz pianists
American women pianists
20th-century American singers
20th-century American women singers
20th-century American pianists
21st-century American women